Bazile may refer to one of the following:

People
 Castera Bazile (1923-1966), Haitian painter
 Hervé Bazile (born 1990), Haitian footballer
 Léon Bazile Perrault (1832-1908), French painter
 Nate Bazile is a character on the American TV show Life Unexpected

Places
 Les Autels-Saint-Bazile, French commune
 Saint-Bazile, French commune
 Saint-Bazile-de-la-Roche, French commune
 Saint-Bazile-de-Meyssac, French commune
 Bazile Township, Antelope County, Nebraska, USA
 Bazile Mills, Nebraska, USA